Strete is a village in Devon, England.

Strete may also refer to:

 Strete Raleigh a location in Devon, England
 Craig Strete (born 1950), American science fiction writer of Cherokee descent
 Henry Strete (by 1481–1535/36), Member of the Parliament of England for Plymouth in 1510